Matte may refer to:

Art
 paint with a non-glossy finish. See diffuse reflection.
 a framing element surrounding a painting or watercolor within the outer frame

Film
 Matte (filmmaking), filmmaking and video production technology
 Matte painting, a process of creating sets used in film and video
 Matte box, a camera accessory for controlling lens glare
 Open matte, a filming technique that involves matting out the top and bottom of the film frame in the movie projector

People
 Tom Matte (1939–2021), American football player, quarterback in college and (mostly) running back in the NFL (1960s-1970s)
 Matte family, a powerful Chilean family

Places
 Rivière à Matte (English: Matte's River), a tributary of the northwest shore of the St. Lawrence River, in Neuville, Quebec, Canada
 A neighborhood in Bern, Switzerland

Other uses
 In American English, of a surface: having a non-glossy finish. See Gloss (optics).
 Matte display, an electronic display with a matte surface
 Matte (metallurgy), a term for the liquid generated by smelting non-ferrous metals, such as copper
 "Matte Kudasai",a 1981 single by the band King Crimson
 MATTE, Major Accident to the Environment, term used in EU legislation

See also
 Mat, a generic term for a piece of fabric or flat material, generally placed on a floor or other flat surface, and serving a range of purposes
 Mate (disambiguation)
 Matt (disambiguation)
 Matthew (disambiguation)
 Maat (disambiguation)
 Mat (disambiguation)